Abdullah bin Saud Al Saud (died May 1819) was the ruler of the First Saudi State from 1814 to 1818. He was the last ruler of the First Saudi State and was executed in Constantinople under the Ottoman Empire. Although the Ottomans maintained several garrisons in the Nejd thereafter, they were unable to prevent the rise of the Emirate of Nejd, also known as the Second Saudi State, led by Turki bin Abdullah.

Early life
Abdullah was the eldest son of Saud bin Abdulaziz who declared him as the heir apparent in 1805. Abdullah's first military command was in 1811. In his second command he fought against the Egyptians in 1812, and was unable to defeat them who ultimately recaptured Hejaz. Upon his inability in the battle Saud bin Abdulaziz retook the command which delayed the capture of the region.

Reign
Abdullah succeeded his father, Saud, in May 1814. At the beginning of his reign Abdullah faced intrafamily challenges from his uncle Abdullah bin Muhammad, but he managed to settle down these problems. 

His father had initiated a war with the Ottoman Empire with the capture of Hejaz which were regained by the Ottomans in 1813. Because of his father's conquest, Abdullah immediately had to face an invasion of his domains by an Ottoman-Egyptian army under the command of Ibrahim Pasha, the son of Muhammad Ali Pasha. The Ottoman forces began their campaign by quickly recapturing Mecca and Medina. Heavily outnumbered and under-equipped, the forces of Diriyah Emirate were defeated in 1815 and retreated to their stronghold of Najd. Following the battle Muhammad Ali sent a letter to Abdullah requesting his submission, and in May 1815 an agreement was made which terminated Abdullah's claims over two holy cities, Mecca and Medina, and the recognition of the supremacy of the Ottoman sultan. Between 1814 and 1816 another event that Abdullah had to deal with was the concerns of the British in regard to the piracy originated from Qasimi region. Abdullah sent several letters to William Bruce who was the British resident in Bushehr to inform him that the Emirate did not involve in any such event.

Rather than engage the Ottomans in open battle, Abdullah decided to attempt to weather the invasion by fortifying his forces in the Najd towns in 1816. As a result, Ibrahim took the villages of Najd one by one, sacking any town that resisted. Ibrahim finally reached the Saudi capital at Diriyah. After a siege that lasted several months, Abdullah finally surrendered on 9 September 1818, marking the end of the Saudi state.

Fall of the Emirate and execution of Abdullah bin Saud
Ibrahim systematically razed Diriyah to the ground and sent many members of the Al Saud clan into captivity in Egypt and Constantinople, the Ottoman Empire. Three brothers of Abdullah and eighteen Al Saud members were killed. Abdullah, his three sons and two of his supporters were brought to Cairo in November 1818. 

After six-month stay in Cairo Abdullah was transferred to Constantinople where he and his two supporters were publicly beheaded in May 1819 for their crimes against holy cities and mosques in the square before Hagia Sophia when he refused to pardon. Hakan Özoğlu and Altan Tan argue that Abdullah's four sons were also beheaded with him. Prior to his execution, Abdullah, who forbade listening to music, was forced to listen to the lute.

Reasons for his execution
In 1801, the mausoleum of Imam Husayn was defaced by the army of Abdullah bin Saud, causing anger and shock among entire Muslim world. As a result, the Ottoman authorities found themselves in a situation that they had to punish the Saudis for their crimes. The guardian of Islam's religious places was the Turkish-Ottoman Caliph in Constantinople, Mahmud II, who ordered that an Egyptian force be sent to the Arabian Peninsula to defeat Abdullah bin Saud and his allies. In 1818, an Egyptian army led by Ibrahim Pasha completely destroyed Abdullah's forces and took their capital, Diriyah, in Najd. Abdullah bin Saud was captured along with two of his supporters who were then sent to Cairo and then to Constantinople.

References

External links

19th-century executions by the Ottoman Empire
19th-century monarchs in the Middle East
19th-century murdered monarchs
1819 deaths
Executed monarchs
Executed Saudi Arabian people
Abdullah
Monarchs taken prisoner in wartime
People executed by the Ottoman Empire by decapitation
People of the Wahhabi War
Year of birth missing